A vanilla slice, also known as a custard square, is a type of pastry. It is one of a category of slices, both sweet and savory, common in the region.

The Australian vanilla slice has been described as a uniquely Australian food, but comparisons have been drawn to the mille-feuille, which may have originated in France.

An annual competition for the best vanilla slice baker is the Great Australian Vanilla Slice Triumph. Judging criteria include "when tasted, should reveal a custard with a creamy smooth texture and a balance of vanilla taste with a crisp, crunchy pastry topped with a smooth and shiny glaze/fondant".

See also
 List of cakes
 Zucchini slice

References

Australian desserts
Custard desserts
Pastries